Lochem is a railway station just north of Lochem, Netherlands. The station opened on 1 November 1865 and is located on the Zutphen–Glanerbeek railway (Staatslijn D). The services are operated by Syntus.

The station is located on the opposite side of the Twentekanaal to Lochem, but is a short walk or bus ride.

Train services

Bus services

External links
NS website 
Dutch Public Transport journey planner 

Railway stations in Gelderland
Railway stations opened in 1865
Railway stations on the Staatslijn D
Lochem
1865 establishments in the Netherlands
Railway stations in the Netherlands opened in the 19th century